Alexander Russo (born 26 July 1994) is a Brazilian track and field sprinter who competes in the 400 metres. He represented the host nation at the 2016 Rio Olympics. He holds a personal best of 46.15 seconds for the 400 m, set in 2014.

He won 400 m individual medals in age category competitions at the 2013 South American Junior Championships in Athletics and the 2014 South American Under-23 Championships in Athletics. At those events he took gold with the Brazilian 4 × 400 metres relay team. He was also a relay finalist at the 2015 Military World Games and the 2016 Summer Olympics.

Personal bests
100 metres – 10.92 (2012)
200 metres – 21.62 (2012)
400 metres – 46.15 (2014)
4 × 100 metres relay – 40.24 (2014)
4 × 400 metres relay – 3:00.43 (2016)

All information from All-Athletics profile.

International competitions

References

External links
 
 

Living people
1994 births
Brazilian male sprinters
Olympic athletes of Brazil
Athletes (track and field) at the 2016 Summer Olympics
21st-century Brazilian people